The Northern Ireland Act 2009 (c 3) is an Act of the Parliament of the United Kingdom. It makes provision preparatory to the intended devolution of "policing and justice" to the Northern Ireland Assembly.

Commencement
The whole Act has been brought into force.

Sections 1 and 3(2) and 4 and 5 came into force on 12 March 2009.

Paragraphs 35(1) and (3) of Schedule 4, so far as they relate to the President or other member of the Charity Tribunal for Northern Ireland, and section 2(3), so far as it relates to those provisions, came into force on 26 September 2009.

The following provisions came into force on 12 April 2010:
Section 2, so far as not already in force
Section 3(1)
Schedules 2 and 3
Schedule 4, so far as not already in force
Schedules 5 and 6

See also
Northern Ireland Act

References
Halsbury's Statutes,

External links
The Northern Ireland Act 2009, as amended from the National Archives.
The Northern Ireland Act 2009, as originally enacted from the National Archives.
Explanatory notes to the Northern Ireland Act 2009.

United Kingdom Acts of Parliament 2009
Acts of the Parliament of the United Kingdom concerning Northern Ireland
2009 in Northern Ireland